Paranamera ankangensis is a species of beetle in the family Cerambycidae. It was described by Chiang in 1981. It is known from China.

References

Lamiini
Beetles described in 1981